John Klingensmith Jr. (March 26, 1786 – February 8, 1854) was an American politician from Pennsylvania who served as a Jacksonian member of the U.S. House of Representatives for Pennsylvania's 19th congressional district from 1835 to 1839.

Biography
John Klingensmith Jr. was born in Westmoreland County, Pennsylvania to John J. Sr. and Anna Elizabeth (Kauffer) Klingensmith.  He was sheriff of Westmoreland County from 1819 to 1822 and again from 1828 to 1831.

Career
Klingensmith was elected as a Jacksonian to the Twenty-fourth Congress and reelected as a Democrat to the Twenty-fifth Congress.

He was a member of the Pennsylvania State Senate for the 18th district from 1831 to 1835 and served as secretary of the land office of Pennsylvania from 1839 to 1842.

Klingensmith was co-owner of The Greensburg Democrat newspaper from 1853 to 1854.

Death
He died in 1854 in Westmoreland County and is buried in West Newton Cemetery in West Newton, Pennsylvania.

Footnotes

Sources

The Political Graveyard

|-

1786 births
1854 deaths
19th-century American newspaper founders
19th-century American politicians
Burials in Pennsylvania
Jacksonian members of the United States House of Representatives from Pennsylvania
Pennsylvania sheriffs
Democratic Party members of the United States House of Representatives from Pennsylvania
Democratic Party Pennsylvania state senators
People from Westmoreland County, Pennsylvania
American people of German descent